Alexander Myburgh (1848–1889) was a South African barrister who served as the chairman of the Shanghai Municipal Council from 1883 to 1884.

Early life

Myburgh was born in 1848. He was the fifth surviving son of Francis Gerhard Myburgh.  He was educated at Trinity Hall, Cambridge where he obtained an LLB.  He was called as a barrister of the Inner Temple in 1871

Life in Shanghai

Myburgh moved to Shanghai from Japan in the 1870s to practice as a barrister.  He first entered practice with Mr R.W.M. Bird and then with Mr Cowie.  In 1880 and 1881 he acted as the Crown Advocate of the British Supreme Court for China and Japan, while the Crown Advocate, Nicholas Hannen was on leave.

In 1883, Myburgh was elected Chairman of the Shanghai Municipal Council and served in that position for one year.

Death

Myburgh died in July 1889, in Margate, England.

References

History of Shanghai
Chairmen of the Shanghai Municipal Council
1848 births
1889 deaths
Alumni of Trinity Hall, Cambridge